Utsa Patnaik is an Indian Marxian economist. She taught at the Centre for Economic Studies and Planning in the School of Social Sciences at Jawaharlal Nehru University (JNU) in New Delhi, from 1973 until her retirement in 2010. Her husband is the Marxian economist Prabhat Patnaik.

Biography
Patnaik obtained her doctorate in economics from the Somerville College, Oxford, before returning to India to join JNU. Her main areas of research interest are the problems of transition from agriculture and peasant predominant societies to industrial society, both in a historical context and at present in relation to India; and questions relating to food security and poverty.

Selected works
These issues have been discussed in more than 110 papers published as chapters in books and in journals. She has authored several books, including Peasant Class Differentiation – A Study in Method (1987), The Long Transition (1999) and The Republic of Hunger and Other Essays (2007). A German translation of selections from the last book appeared in 2009. She has also edited and co-edited several volumes including Chains of Servitude – Bondage and Slavery in India (1985), Agrarian Relations and Accumulation – the Mode of Production Debate in India (1991), The Making of History – Essays presented to Irfan Habib (2000), The Agrarian Question in Marx and his Successors in two volumes (2007, 2011) and A Theory of Imperial Capitalism.

Book reviews
 Bagchi, Amiya Kumar. On A Theory of Imperialism. Social Scientist, edited by Utsa Patnaik and Prabhat Patnaik, vol. 45, no. 3/4, Social Scientist, 2017, pp. 87–91.
 Vijay, R. The Agrarian Question and the Marxist Method. Economic and Political Weekly, edited by Utsa Patnaik, vol. 48, no. 35, Economic and Political Weekly, 2013, pp. 27–30.
 Pratt, Brian. Development in Practice, edited by Utsa Patnaik and Sam Moyo, vol. 22, no. 7, Taylor & Francis, Ltd., 2012, pp. 1060–1061.
 Gopinath, Ravindran. Social Scientist, edited by Utsa Patnaik, vol. 36, no. 1/2, Social Scientist, 2008, pp. 94–97.
 Bose, Sugata. The Journal of Asian Studies, edited by Jan Breman et al. , vol. 47, no. 4, [Cambridge University Press, Association for Asian Studies], 1988, pp. 912–914, doi:10.2307/2057913.

Selected journal articles

2010–2019

2000–2009

References

Alumni of Somerville College, Oxford
Marxian economists
20th-century Indian economists
Indian Marxists
Living people
Women historians
Indian women economists
Indian Marxist historians
Indian political writers
20th-century Indian women scientists
21st-century Indian women scientists
20th-century Indian women writers
20th-century Indian non-fiction writers
20th-century Indian educators
English-language writers from India
20th-century Indian historians
Indian women historians
Indian women political writers
21st-century Indian economists
21st-century non-fiction writers
Women writers from Delhi
Women scientists from Delhi
Year of birth missing (living people)
Women educators from Delhi
Educators from Delhi
20th-century women educators